Saint Brigid's Church or St Brigid's Church may refer to:

Australia
 St Brigids Catholic Church, Rosewood in Queensland
 St Brigid's Church, Perth in Western Australia
 St Brigid's Church, Stuart in Queensland
 Canada
Saint Brigid's Church (Ottawa)
St. Brigid's Church, Prince Edward Island
Ireland
St Brigid's Church, Clara, County Offaly
St Brigid's Church of Ireland Church, Clara, County Offaly
St Brigid's Church, Croghan, County Offaly
St Brigid's Church, Deerpark, County Wicklow
St Brigid's Church, Kilbride, County Wicklow
St. Brigid's Church, Straffan, County Kildare
St Brigid's Church, Talbotstown, County Wicklow
 UK
St Brigid's Church, Kilbirnie, Scotland
 USA
St. Brigid's Roman Catholic Church (Manhattan)

See also 
 St Bridget's Church (disambiguation)